This is part of the list of Mormon missionary diarists, covering diarists who served full-time missions in Asia and the Middle East.

References 

Diarists
Diarists
Diarists
Harold B. Lee Library-related articles